Alan John Sieler (born 17 July 1948) is an Australian former cricketer. A left-handed all-rounder, he played 39 first-class cricket matches for Victoria between 1970 and 1977. In the opening match of the Sheffield Shield in 1973–74 against Queensland, Sieler scored 157 and 105, sharing in fifth-wicket partnerships of 271 and 184 with Robert Rose.

See also
 List of Victoria first-class cricketers

References

External links
 

1948 births
Living people
Australian cricketers
Victoria cricketers
Cricketers from Sydney